Plutella hyperboreella is a moth of the  family Plutellidae. It is found in Finland, Norway,  Sweden, arctic Russia and Canada (Nunavut, Northwest Territories and Québec).

The wingspan is 14–17 mm. Adults have been recorded on wing in July.

The larvae feed on Arabis alpina and Draba species in Europe.

References

Moths described in 1902
Plutellidae
Moths of Europe
Moths of North America